Epicentro is a 2020 Spanish-language documentary film directed by Hubert Sauper. The film stars Oona Chaplin and has been described as a travelogue focused on Cuba. At the 2020 Sundance Film Festival, it won the Grand Jury Prize in the World Cinema Documentary Competition and it has  rating on review-aggregator website Rotten Tomatoes. The critical consensus on Rotten Tomatoes reads, "As evocative as it is thought-provoking, Epicentro takes an affectionate look at a people and culture -- and delivers a quietly effective rejoinder to lingering Cold War resentment." It runs for 107 minutes and is in English and Spanish with English subtitles.

References

Sundance Film Festival award winners
2020 films
2020 documentary films
Austrian documentary films
French documentary films
American documentary films
2020s American films
2020s French films